The Russian Television and Radio Broadcasting Company (VGTRK), also known as Russian Television and Radio, is a state-owned broadcaster which operates many television and radio channels in 53 of Russia's languages. The company was founded in 1990 and is based in Moscow.

The broadcasting of the All-Russia TV and radio channels is located in Moscow, and also via the regional transmitting centres of the Russian Television and Radio Broadcasting Network forming the terrestrial transmitting network. TV and radio channels from Moscow are delivered to the regions via satellite and terrestrial communication channels.

In 2022, in the context of ongoing Russian invasion of Ukraine the company has been accused of spreading propaganda and disinformation, while inciting discord, war, and hatred. Unlike RT, it was mostly produced for internal consumption. In 2017 at least one of its channels, RTR Planeta, has been banned in Lithuania.

History
On 21 June 1990, the 1st Congress of People's Deputies adopted a resolution on RSFSR media ascribing the RSFSR Council of Ministers take measures to establish the Committee for Television and Radio Broadcasting of the RSFSR. On 14 July 1990, a decree of the Presidium of the Supreme Soviet of the RSFSR established the Russian State Television and Radio Broadcasting Company. The former deputy editor of the newspaper Moscow News, Oleg Poptsov, was appointed as its first chairman.

On 10 December 1990 Radio Rossii began broadcasting. It first began broadcasting on a radio channel with the first program of All-Union Radio, as well as with "Mayak" radio channel and the third with the Third All-Union Radio program. On 13 May 1991, the VGTRK began broadcasting television to Russia (originally scheduled to begin broadcasting in March 1991 but constantly postponed) and broadcast with the Second Central Television program. On 16 September 1991, the Second Program of USSR Central Television closed, and VGTRK took over the remaining airtime. On 18 April 1992, channel Rossiya 4 began broadcasting.

On 6 July 1992, the fourth channel started broadcasting to Russian universities, and broadcast with the 4th channel, Ostankino, until 16 January 1994, and from 17 January 1994, with the NTV channel, and as a part of RTR television which had created the "Russian Universities" feed. In February 1996, by Presidential decree of Boris Yeltsin, Oleg Poptsov stepped down from the post of RTR Chairman. Eduard Sagalaev was appointed president of RTR's "Moscow Independent Broadcasting Corporation (MIBC)" TV6 Moscow. On 11 November 1996, the "Russian Universities" block stopped broadcasting, and its airtime passed to NTV. The first satellite TV networks "The RTR TV network", "Meteor Sports" and "Meteor Cinema" were launched. On 1 November 1997, the VGTRK began broadcasting an educational channel called "Culture". It began broadcasting on a VHF channel.

On 8 May 1998, the presidential decree "On Improvement of Public Electronic Media" was drafted based on information regarding RTR. On the basis of the decree of the All-Russian State Television and Radio Company, the All-Russian radio station "Mayak" and the Russian State Radio Company Voice of Russia were created.

In 2000, VGTRK became one of the members of Euronews and organized the Russian-language service of this organization. In 2002, VGTRK acquired a share in Euronews' stock.

On 3 December 2012, the VGTRK began test broadcasts of the first Russian cinema TV channel, "Kino-TV". On 17 December 2012, the VGTRK began test broadcasts with the high definition TV channel Rossiya HD. On 29 December 2012, Rossiya HD started regular broadcasting. On 29 January 2013, at the Annual Exhibition and Forum of Television and Telecommunications (CSTB-2013), RTR announced the merger of eleven digital channels under a single brand, called "Digital TV". It includes documentary, sports, entertainment and movie channels, of which are "Russian-HD", "My Planet", "Nauka 2.0", "Sport", "Sport-1-HD", " The Fighting Club", "Russian Roman", "Russian Bestseller", "Strana" and "Sarafan". On 9 May 2013, the channel began broadcasting a documentary about Russian history "History", of which had also entered the TV package "Digital TV". On 4 April 2014, the VGTRK began broadcasting a channel dedicated to domestic detective films and TV series under the name "Russian Detective". 15 April 2014 saw the launch of the official international cognitive entertainment channel IQ HD. On 1 June 2014, the launch of the Mult channel was announced.

As a reaction to the Russian invasion of Ukraine, the European Union expressed plans for a broad ban on three of the biggest Russian state-run broadcasters in early May 2022. These TV channels are "mouthpieces that amplify Putin's lies and propaganda aggressively" said EU Commission President Ursula von der Leyen. BBC reported that they are thought to include the widely watched Russian-language VGTRK chanels Rossiya and RTR Planeta. Befopre the EU has already suspended the direct Kremlin owned RT and Sputnik, that broadcast in English, German and Spanish. On 8 July, the company was sanctioned.

The Russian Ministry of Defense announced in June 2022 that in the region around the occupied southern Ukrainian city of Kherson, the one million inhabitants in the area would henceforth be supplied with the most important Russian channels instead of Ukrainian television. In particular, those of the state broadcasting group VGTRK were activated.

Operations
VGTRK owns and operates five national television stations, two international networks, five radio stations, and 80 regional TV and radio networks. It also runs the information agency Rossiya Segodnya.

The All-Russian State Television and Radio Broadcasting Company (VGTRK) is Russia's largest media corporation. It comprises two national TV channels: "Rossiya 1", "Rossiya K" and also broadcasts "Bibigon", the first public state television channel for children and youth, 89 regional TV and radio channels broadcasting in all regions of the Russian Federation, "Rossiya 24", Russia's first 24/7 news channel, "Rossiya 2", the sports and entertainment, "RTR Planeta", a TV channel operating worldwide since 2002; a Russian-language version of the "Euronews" TV channel; five radio channels: "Radio Rossiyi", "Mayak" (Lighthouse), "Kultura", "Vesti FM", "Yunost", and "Rossiya", and a public Internet channel combining online resources.

In early 1993, the All-Russian State Television and Radio Broadcasting Company acquired the status of a national broadcasting company. That same year, the VGTRK became a full member of the European Broadcasting Union, entitled to key decisions in the EBU operation.

"Rossiya 1", the main TV channel, traces its history back to May 1991. Today, Rossiya 1 is a national channel that broadcasts over most of the country. The channel's audience comprises 98.5 per cent of Russia's population and more than 50 million viewers in the CIS and Baltic countries. The "RTR Planeta" channel, an international version of "Rossiya 1", is watched in the U.S., Europe, Middle East, North Africa and China.

Rossiya TV is a developing company whose broadcasts carry information programs, TV miniseries and series, political journalism, talk shows, game shows, comedies and other game formats, full-length feature films and documentaries, sporting and political events along with other entertainment. Apart from acquiring broadcasting rights, Rossiya TV Channel was the first among the Russian TV channels to launch its own large-scale production of TV films, both full-length and miniseries, focusing on classics. Films represent about 35% of the total broadcasts by the Rossiya TV channel. The channel purchases film broadcasting rights in cooperation with 50 major production and distributor companies.
The main news program, Vesti, is a leading information program in Russia. During the previous TV season, Vesti adopted a 24/7 production cycle with two-hour intervals, which allows for the news to be broadcast live across all Russian time zones.

Television
 Russia-1 (Россия-1) — entertainment, news (formerly Russia, RTR-1, RTR & RTV)
 Russia-24 (Россия-24) — news channel (formerly Vesti)
 Russia-K (Россия-К) — culture channel (formerly Culture, RTR-2)
 Carousel (Карусель) — children & teenager channel (jointly with Channel One Russia)

International channels
 RTR-Planeta (РТР-Планета) — internationally broadcasting channel
 Different versions for CIS countries, Belarus, Moldova, etc.

Thematic and regional

 Moscow 24 (Москва 24) — News channel broadcasting in Moscow (formerly Stolitsa and TV Tsentr Stolitsa)
 360° Moscow Region
 The Russian-language edition of Euronews named "Euronews in Russian language" (Euronews на Русском языке), not to be confused with "Evronovosti TV/Евроновости"
 20 theme-channels under the brand "Digital Television".
 90 regional TV channels in Russia

Former channels
 Bibigon (Бибигон) – channel dedicated to children and adolescents, replaced by Carousel in 2010. 
 Russia-2 (Россия-2) — sports, entertainment, documentaries, movies, news channel, acquired by Gazprom-Media in 2015, replaced by Match TV
 Sport (Спорт) — sports channel, acquired by Gazprom-Media in 2015
 Sport-1 (Спорт-1) — pay-TV sports channel, acquired by Gazprom-Media in 2015

Radio
 Radio Kultura – cultural radio, only broadcast terrestrially at 91.6 FM in Moscow
 Radio Mayak – general entertainment, current affairs, and adult contemporary music
 Radio Rossii – talk radio and regional programming
 Radio Yunost – Online only,  formerly European and American pop music, now older Soviet music
 Vesti FM – news radio

Executive board 
Chairmen:
 Oleg Poptsov (1990—96)
 Eduard Sagalaev (1996—97)
 Nikolay Svanidze (1997—98)
 Mikhail Shvydkoy (1998—2000)
 Oleg Dobrodeyev (2000–present)

References

External links 

  

1990 establishments in the Soviet Union
Companies based in Moscow
Mass media companies of Russia
Mass media companies of the Soviet Union
Radio in Russia
Radio in the Soviet Union
Television networks in Russia
Television channels and stations established in 1990
Television in the Soviet Union
Multilingual broadcasters
Federal State Unitary Enterprises of Russia
Russia-1
State media